Pedro Pullen Parente (born February 21, 1953, in Rio de Janeiro) is a Brazilian engineer, politician and administrator, former president of the state oil company Petrobras.

History
Born in a family with great political connections, Pedro Parente started his career in the public administration at 20 years old while studying to receive his bachelor's degree in Electronic engineering. He was moved from the Bank of Brazil to the Ministry of Planning of Andrea Calabi, under request of his executive secretary João Sayad, to help create the Secretary of National Treasury. Years later, he worked in the governments of José Sarney and Fernando Collor de Mello until he played greater roles during the administration of Fernando Henrique Cardoso.

Under Cardoso's presidency, Parente became Chief of Staff from January 1, 1999, to January 1, 2003, Minister of Planning, Budget and Management from May  6 to July 18, 1999, executive secretary of the Ministry of Finance and also accumulated the position of Minister of Mines and Energy in 2002. During that time he was known as "blackout minister", for being the coordinator of the crisis management team during the power outages that happened in that very year. He left the public administration for the private sector once Luiz Inácio Lula da Silva came to office and was appointed as vice-president of the Brazilian media conglomerate RBS group, until accepting, in 2010, the position of CEO and president of Bunge Brazil, one of the biggest trading companies in the world, which made its sugar and alcohol productions assets available for sale to concentrate on more profitable operations in grains, seeds oils and processed foods.

On 19 May 2016, Parente was appointed by then acting president Michel Temer to the office of president of Petrobras. His name was submitted and approved by the Administrative Council of the company, an essential requirement to take office. He was sworn in on June 1, 2017.

On 1 June 2018, after a week long trucker's strike against fuel prices, Parente resigned from the presidency of Petrobras.

References

1953 births
Living people
Brazilian engineers
People from Rio de Janeiro (city)
University of Brasília alumni
Energy ministers of Brazil
Brazilian chief executives
Government ministers of Brazil
Chiefs of Staff of Brazil